Mandla Zwane (born 23 June 1973) is a former South African football player that plays mostly as an attacking midfielder or supporting striker.

Career
He played most of his career in Orlando Pirates having played also for FC Porto and Selangor of Malaysia.

Zwane signed for FC Porto in 1994, but never made a Portuguese Liga appearance for the club, instead going on loan to F.C. Penafiel.

International career
He was capped once for South Africa.

References

External links

1973 births
Living people
People from Thulamela Local Municipality
South African soccer players
South African expatriate soccer players
South Africa international soccer players
FC Porto players
F.C. Penafiel players
Gil Vicente F.C. players
Primeira Liga players
Orlando Pirates F.C. players
SuperSport United F.C. players
Black Leopards F.C. players
Mpumalanga Black Aces F.C. players
Expatriate footballers in Portugal
South African expatriate sportspeople in Portugal
Association football forwards
Sportspeople from Limpopo